The Saint Peter's Plot is a 1978 thriller novel by the British writer Derek Lambert. During the closing stage of the Second World War, the Nazis hatch a plot to save their leaders from disaster.

References

Bibliography
 Burton, Alan. Historical Dictionary of British Spy Fiction. Rowman & Littlefield, 2016.

1978 British novels
Novels by Derek Lambert
British thriller novels
Novels set in the 1940s
Novels about Nazi Germany